Academia de Futbol Sporting San Miguelito is a Panamanian professional football team playing in Liga Panameña de Fútbol (the highest level of Panamanian football). Founded in 1989, it is based in San Miguelito District of Panamá Province.

History

Sporting '89 
The club was founded in 1989 by Cesar Morales as a youth soccer academy called Sporting '89. In 1997 reached ANAPROF by winning to Chorrillo F.C. in a promotion playoff. Making their top tier debut on 19 July 1997 against Chiriquí F.C. (2-1 win)

Sporting Coclé 
In the summer of 2002, the club was relocated to Antón, Province of Coclé changing its name to Sporting Coclé under Ruben Navarro management, citing the lack of youth development on San Miguelito District.

Sporting San Miguelito 
Five years later (2007), they relocated back to San Miguelito and changed their name again, adopting the name of San Miguelito, which remains the club name today.
Starting in 2011-2012, San Miguelito became a title contender.  They topped the table in the regular season of both Apertura 2011 and Clausura 2012 (although they were eliminated in the semifinals each time).  Then, in Clausura 2013, they claimed their first title by defeating San Francisco 4-1 in the championship final.  They also reached the finals of Apertura 2015.  Since then, results have declined, although the club has as of yet evaded relegation.

Stadium

Players

First-team squad 
 For Apertura 2015

Non-playing staff

Board of directors

Management hierarchy

Notable players

Historical list of coaches 

 Víctor René Mendieta (1997)
 José Montenegro (-Jul 2002)
 Jairo Silva (July 2002 – 2003)
 Jair Palacios (July 2003–)
 Edgar López López (July 2008–08)
 Leonicio de la Flor
 Carlos Walcott (Oct 2009 – Nov 09)
 Fernando García Ramos (Nov 2009 – March 10)
 Percival Piggott (March 2010 – Nov 10)
 Richard Parra (Dec 2010 – Dec 11)
 Pacifico Girón (Jan 2012 – Sept 12)
 Mario Anthony Torres (Sept 2012–)
 Jair Palacios (Jan 2019–Present)

 César Eduardo Méndez  (December 2020 - April 2021)
 Saúl Maldonado (April 2021 - November 2021)
 Felipe Borowsky (November 2021 - Present)

Honours 
Liga Panameña de Fútbol: 1
Clausura 2013
Primera A: 1
1996–97

References

External links
 
Sporting's Blog
Sporting's Blog

Football clubs in Panama
Sporting '89
1989 establishments in Panama
San Miguelito District